Michalis Kaltezas (19 June 1970 – 17 November 1985) was a 15-year-old who was shot at the back of his head by a police officer during the annual 17 November protests.  The police officer was sentenced to two years imprisonment, but he appealed and was declared innocent. Melistas defense lawyer was Alexandros Lykourezos; the plaintiff attorneys were Nikos Konstantopoulos and Fotis Kouvelis.

Leftist terrorist organization 17 November attacked a police van to revenge the death of Kaltezas; the attack resulted in the death of a police officer.

References

1970 births
1985 deaths
1985 murders in Greece
Autonomism
Deaths by firearm in Greece
Greek murder victims
People murdered in Greece
People from Athens